Daniel Edward Sidney Lloyd (born October 13, 1972) is an American former child actor best known for his role as Danny Torrance in the horror film The Shining (1980) an adaptation of Stephen King's 1977 novel of the same name.

Life and career
Lloyd was born in Tremont, Illinois. His first and best-known role is that of Danny Torrance in Stanley Kubrick's The Shining (1980). He was selected for the role due to his ability to maintain his concentration for extended periods. In the DVD commentary by Garrett Brown and John Baxter, they state that Kubrick was able to film all of Lloyd's scenes without the six-year-old actor realizing he was in a horror film. He was led to believe that he was just acting in a drama film about a family who lives in a hotel.

Lloyd was interviewed in Making The Shining (1980), filmed by Kubrick's daughter, Vivian Kubrick. Despite his well-received performance in The Shining, Lloyd retired from acting at the age of ten after his appearance as young G. Gordon Liddy in the television film Will: G. Gordon Liddy (1982).

In 2004, Lloyd became associate professor at the department of biology at Elizabethtown Community and Technical College in Elizabethtown, Kentucky.

In 2019, Lloyd appeared in a cameo role as a spectator at a baseball game in the Shining sequel Doctor Sleep, his first acting role in 36 years.

Personal life

Lloyd is married to Jessi Bowers (born 1981) and has two children of his own, as well as two stepchildren from his wife's previous relationship.

Filmography

Film

References

External links
 
 

1972 births
20th-century American educators
20th-century American male actors
21st-century American educators
American male child actors
American male film actors
American male television actors
Living people
Male actors from Chicago
People from Pekin, Illinois
Schoolteachers from Kentucky